Eleftherios Goulielmakis (Ελευθέριος Γουλιελμάκης) is a Greek physicist specializing in lasers. He is a professor of physics at the University of Rostock, Germany where he currently leads the research activities of the Extreme Photonics  group. Previously, he was the head of the research group "Attoelectronics" at the Max Planck Institute of Quantum Optics in Garching, Germany.

Biography
He obtained his Bachelor´s and Master´s degree in physics and optoelectronics respectively from the University of Crete, Greece and the PhD degree (Dr. rer. nat.) from Ludiwig-Maximilans-Universität (LMU) in Munich in 2005. 

Selected recent works

References

External links
 Homepage of the research group Attoelectronics
 Homepage of the research group Xtreme Photonics

21st-century Greek physicists
University of Crete alumni
1975 births
Living people
Scientists from Heraklion